George William Draper III (born August 5, 1953) is a Judge of the Supreme Court of Missouri. He was appointed to the court in 2011 by Governor Jay Nixon. Prior to his appointment to the Supreme Court, he served on the Missouri Court of Appeals from 2000 to 2011. From 1998 to 2000, he served as a circuit judge in the St. Louis County Circuit Court; from 1994 to 1998 he was an associate circuit judge on the same court. He earned his Bachelor of Arts from Morehouse College, and his Juris Doctor from Howard University School of Law. His term as Chief Justice ended on June 30, 2021.

References

External links
 George W. Draper III on the Missouri Supreme Court website 

|-

1953 births
21st-century American judges
African-American judges
Chief Justices of the Supreme Court of Missouri
Howard University School of Law alumni
Judges of the Supreme Court of Missouri
Living people
Morehouse College alumni
Saint Louis University School of Law faculty
21st-century African-American people
20th-century African-American people